"So help me God" is a phrase by which one may swear an oath. 

So help me God may also refer to:

"So Help Me God", a song by DC Talk from the album Jesus Freak, 1995
So Help Me God!, a 2020 album by 2 Chainz
The Life of Pablo, a 2016 album by Kanye West formerly titled So Help Me God
So Help Me God, a play by Maurine Dallas Watkin; see 2010 Drama Desk Award
So Help Me God, a 1955 novel by Felix Jackson
So Help Me God (book), a 2022 autobiography by Mike Pence
Brantley Gilbert (2022)